The seventh series of the British science fiction television programme Doctor Who was broadcast concurrently on BBC One in the United Kingdom, and was split into two parts as the previous series had been. Following its premiere on 1 September 2012, the series aired weekly with five episodes until 29 September. The remaining eight episodes were broadcast between 30 March and 18 May 2013. The 2012 Christmas special, "The Snowmen", aired separately from the main series and introduced a new TARDIS interior, title sequence, theme tune, and outfit for the Doctor.

Doctor Whos seventh series was the show's third and final series to feature Matt Smith, Karen Gillan and Arthur Darvill. They reprised their roles of the Eleventh Doctor, Amy Pond and Rory Williams, from the previous series. Gillan and Darvill departed the series in the fifth episode, "The Angels Take Manhattan", after which a new companion named Clara Oswald joined the Doctor, played by Jenna-Louise Coleman, remaining with the series for its second half. The main story arc of the series focused on the significance of the character of Clara, whom the Doctor had encountered twice before as Oswin in "Asylum of the Daleks" and as a governess in "The Snowmen". It also features the recurring appearance of the Doctor's enemy, The Great Intelligence, who is later revealed to be trying to gain the Doctor's true name for his own purposes. Smith stayed for one year longer than Gillan and Darvill, and departed after the 2013 specials, with his final appearance being in the 2013 Christmas special "The Time of the Doctor".

Episodes 

As with Series 6, this series was again split into two parts. For the first time in the show's history, each episode of this series is a standalone story with no multi-parters.

Supplemental episodes

Prequels  
Prologue videos to selected episodes were released via various online outlets and the Children in Need 2012 appeal.

Casting 

The seventh series marked Matt Smith's third and final full series as the eleventh incarnation of the Doctor. Karen Gillan and Arthur Darvill, who portray Amy Pond and Rory Williams respectively, departed the programme in the fifth episode. The decision to write the pair out of the series was a mutual decision from Gillan and showrunner Steven Moffat. The actress previously stated that she did not want to make return cameos to the show.

On 21 March 2012, it was announced that Jenna Coleman would replace Gillan and Darvill as the next companion. She auditioned for the role in secrecy, pretending it was for something called Men on Waves, an anagram for "Woman Seven". Moffat chose her for the role because she worked the best alongside Smith and could talk faster than him. He stated that her character will be different from previous companions, though he attempted to keep the details of her character a secret until she debuted in the Christmas special. In "Asylum of the Daleks", Coleman appears as the character Oswin Oswald, a secret which was kept from the public before transmission. Coleman was originally given the role of a Victorian governess named Jasmine, and then for the second audition she was given both the characters of Oswin and Clara. She originally thought that the producers were looking for the right character, but later realised it was part of Moffat's "soft mystery" plan of having multiple iterations of Clara in the events of "The Name of the Doctor".

Guest stars include David Gyasi, Rupert Graves, David Bradley, Riann Steele as Queen Nefertiti in episode 2, Ben Browder, Adrian Scarborough, Garrick Hagon, Steven Berkoff, Ruthie Henshall, Jemma Redgrave, Mike McShane. Dougray Scott, Jessica Raine, David Warner and Liam Cunningham in episode 8, Rachael Stirling and her mother Dame Diana Rigg in episode 11, and Warwick Davis and Tamzin Outhwaite in episode 12. Mark Williams appears in the second and fourth episodes as Rory's father. Alex Kingston returned to the series as her character River Song for Amy and Rory's final episode and the series finale.
Richard E. Grant and Tom Ward were cast in the 2012 Christmas special, together with young actor Cameron Strefford playing a younger version of Grant's character. Ian McKellen also appears in the Christmas special, providing the original voice of the Great Intelligence. Grant later returned in the mid-series premiere and the series finale, portraying the Great Intelligence.

Production

Development 

The BBC commissioned the fourteen-episode seventh series on 8 June 2011. "The Doctor, the Widow and the Wardrobe" was executive produced by Steven Moffat, Piers Wenger and Caroline Skinner. Beth Willis left the BBC and stepped down as executive producer after series 6 and Wenger also departed following the Christmas special, leaving Moffat and Skinner as executive producers for series 7. Marcus Wilson remained as series producer, with Denise Paul producing "The Bells of Saint John", "The Rings of Akhaten", "Nightmare in Silver" and "The Name of the Doctor". Production of Doctor Who relocated to the new Roath Lock studios in Cardiff midway through production of the series on 12 March 2012; the first episode to be filmed there was the Christmas special in Block Four, with the debut of Coleman's character; however it was reported that a later episode written by Neil Cross was the first Coleman filmed. Moffat has stated that the introduction of the new companion will "[reboot] the show a little bit" and "make you look at the Doctor differently".

Writing 
Moffat has stated that the seventh series would be the opposite of the arc-driven nature of the sixth, consisting of mainly stand-alone stories. This was inspired by fan reactions to the title of "Let's Kill Hitler" when it was revealed at the end of "A Good Man Goes to War" with no plot details; he told the writers of the seventh series to "slut it up" with "big, huge, mad ideas" and "write it like a movie poster". Toby Whithouse, writer of the Wild West-themed third episode, stated that each episode would have more of a specific genre, and his was developed from a one-line pitch from Moffat. The stand-alone nature meant that there were no two-part episodes or series-long story arcs. According to Dan Martin of The Guardian, Moffat stated that the goal of the series was "compressed storytelling"; Martin remarked that "Asylum of the Daleks" told more than some of the four-parters in the classic series.

Design changes 

In keeping with the blockbuster theme, the title sequence for the first part of the series (up to and including "The Snowmen") featured a different look to the titles and logo in the title sequence to reflect the concept of the episode. The Time Vortex in the title sequence was also tinted blue and green. The interior of the TARDIS was redesigned starting with the Christmas special, which also featured a new title sequence that, for the first time since the end of Season 26 in 1989, showed the Doctor's face, together with a new orchestration of the theme tune. Moffat had noticed that the TARDIS' design was getting "progressively whimsical" and resembled more of a "magical place" rather than a machine. The set was designed by series production designer Michael Pickwoad, who stated that the new interior was also supposed to be "darker and moodier" and provide an easier access to the "gallery" of the ship when shooting. The new design allowed the entrance to be more central, and also returned the console to the look of the designs in the classic series.

In the Christmas special the Doctor sported a new costume, tying into the purple colour scheme, which Smith described as "a bit Artful Dodger meets the Doctor". Moffat described the new outfit as a "progression" as the Doctor was in "a different phase of his life now" and felt more "grown-up" and fatherlike. In the second half of the series, Moffat intended to show the Doctor not dressing exactly the same way each time, similar to the Third Doctor (Jon Pertwee) and the Fourth Doctor (Tom Baker), who did not wear exactly the same clothes but retained a common "look".

Music
Murray Gold composed the soundtrack to this series, with orchestration by Ben Foster.

Filming 
The seventh series began shooting on 20 February 2012. Episodes 2 and 3 were the first to enter production, directed by Saul Metzstein. Much of the Wild West episode was filmed in March 2012 in the desert area of Almería, Spain, an area which contains Wild-West style streets that have been used in the making of many Western-set films. Filming the episode in Spain was cheaper than constructing a set in the UK. The fifth episode, Amy and Rory's last, was filmed in Central Park in New York City in April 2012, as well as at Cardiff University and a cemetery in Llanelli. The fourth episode was filmed next, the only episode in the third block of production. Doctor Who Magazine reported that the Christmas special would be produced by itself in Block Four. In late May 2012, Coleman was spotted at a manor in the Vale of Glamorgan, filming what was reported to be the Christmas special. However, Neil Cross's episode, reportedly the first Coleman shot, was partially filmed in Margam Country Park, South Wales, around the same time, and it was reported that the manor location was also for that episode, and that Moffat was still writing the Christmas special.  "Cold War" and "The Crimson Horror" were filmed in June and July 2012." The Christmas special began filming the week of 6 August. "Journey to the Centre of the TARDIS" finished filming in September 2012. "The Bells of Saint John" was filmed in London from 8–16 October 2012. "The Rings of Akhaten" became the 100th episode produced since the series returned in 2005, although "The Crimson Horror" was the 100th aired. Scenes for "Nightmare in Silver" were filmed in early November 2012, showing a new design for the Cybermen.

Production blocks were arranged as follows:

Release

Promotion 
Smith, Gillan, Darvill, Moffat, and Skinner all promoted the series at the official Doctor Who convention in Cardiff in March 2012. At the convention the first trailer for the series premiered. Three promotional images of Smith and Coleman were released on 8 June, 11 June, and 13 June. New footage was shown at the 2012 San Diego Comic-Con International on 15 July, consisting of clips from the second and third episodes. The second trailer for the series aired on the BBC on 2 August, as part of the coverage of the London Olympics. The 90-second trailer and a promotional image were first made available online in the morning of 2 August. "Asylum of the Daleks" was screened at BFI Southbank on 14 August, and at the MediaGuardian Edinburgh International Television Festival during 23–25 August. On 25 August it was also screened in New York City. Following the BFI screening, around twenty high-resolution images from the first five episodes were released on the BBC's Doctor Who website. A teaser trailer for "Asylum of the Daleks" was released on 18 August 2012, with a longer version released on 25 August. On 29 August at midnight, the BBC released poster-style artwork for episodes 2–5.

A trailer for the second half of the series first appeared at the end of "The Snowmen". The second was released 16 March 2013. A first picture and the title of "The Bells of Saint John" was released by the BBC on 1 March 2013. "The Bells of Saint John" was first screened to the press on 15 March, though the press was not allowed to release information until 18 March. On 18 March, the BBC released poster-style artwork for episodes 7–10. The prologue and trailer for "The Bells of Saint John" were released on 23 March 2013, and another picture was released on 26 March 2013. On 18 April 2013, the BBC released more poster-style artwork for episodes 11–13. On 19 April 2013, the title and poster for "The Name of the Doctor" were released.

Broadcast 
The Doctor Who official Twitter account announced in March 2012 that it was planned that six episodes would be shown in 2012, including a Christmas Special, to be followed by eight in 2013. In July 2012, Smith stated that it would start in August, but Moffat later confirmed it was September. Part of the reason the show was moved to the start of the year was because Moffat felt the darker nights suited the atmosphere of the programme, as well as the classic series originally airing in the start of the year. He stated that the decision to split the series up originally came from the BBC, but he was open to anything that "shakes [the series] up" and making the audience wait would make it seem like an "event piece".

The first episode was broadcast on 1 September 2012 on BBC One in the United Kingdom, with the fifth episode airing on 29 September 2012. The Christmas episode was broadcast on 25 December 2012 on BBC One in the United Kingdom, and the first episode of the second half of the series was broadcast on 30 March 2013. The series finale, "The Name Of The Doctor", was broadcast on 18 May 2013.

The series premiered on 1 September 2012 on BBC America in the United States, and on Space in Canada. Within minutes of the first episode's UK ending, it was released onto the ABC iview service at 5:10am on 2 September 2012. It premiered 8 September 2012 on ABC1 in Australia, and on 13 September 2012 in New Zealand on Prime TV.

"The Snowmen" aired on 25 December 2012 on BBC America in the US, and the same date on Space in Canada. It aired the next day on ABC in Australia, and Prime in New Zealand.

The first episode of the second half of the series, "The Bells of Saint John", was broadcast on 30 March 2013 on BBC America in the US, and on Space in Canada, and the following day in Australia on ABC1 and in South Africa on BBC Entertainment. Prime TV began airing the remainder of the series in New Zealand on 11 April 2013.

Home media 

"The Doctor, the Widow and the Wardrobe" was released singly onto DVD and Blu-ray on 12 January 2012, episodes 1–5 (dubbed as 'Series 7: Part 1') followed on 29 October 2012 in Region 2 and 13 November 2012 in Region 1. The second part was released on 27 May 2013 containing the remaining episodes plus the 2012 Christmas special "The Snowmen". The remaining eight episodes plus "The Snowmen" were released onto DVD and Blu-ray on 27 May 2013 in Region 2, while the former was released as two separate publications in Region 1 on 28 May 2013. On 12 May 2013, the box set of Series 7 Part 2 was erroneously dispatched to customers who pre-ordered it through the BBC America online store before the series had been fully aired, prompting a plea from show-runner Steven Moffat to keep the final episode "a secret" until broadcast. A 5-disc box set containing all 13 episodes plus the Christmas specials "The Doctor, the Widow and the Wardrobe" and "The Snowmen" was released on 24 September 2013 in Region 1 and 28 October 2013 in Region 2.

In print

Reception

Ratings 
The series received a strong Appreciation Index, with all episodes aside from "The Doctor, the Widow and the Wardrobe", "The Rings of Akhaten", "Cold War" and "Nightmare in Silver" in the "excellent" category of a score of 85 or more. "Asylum of the Daleks", "The Angels Take Manhattan" and "The Name of The Doctor" reached 89, 88, and 88, respectively, with "Asylum of the Daleks"'s score being higher than any of the last season and "The Name of The Doctor" higher than the series finale of the last season.

Critical reception  
On review aggregator Rotten Tomatoes, the series holds a 100% approval rating based on 8 critic reviews, and an average score of 8.82/10. 

Reviewing the first half, SFX gave it 4/5 stars, describing it as "gloriously gorgeous and indomitably imaginative" with praise to the writing, although it did find "Dinosaurs On A Spaceship" to be "a raggedy underachiever" and found the Daleks' appearance in the opener to be unthreatening. Sherry Lipp of Cinema Lowdown wrote that "The first half of this series was somewhat of a disappointment, with more weak-to-average episodes than quality ones" with particular note to the episode "Dinosaurs on a Spaceship" which she describes as one of her "least favorite episodes of the series".

SFX called the second part of the series "the creakiest run of episodes since 1988" but noted that there was "plenty to enjoy", ending the review with "Thankfully 'The Name of the Doctor' is everything we could have hoped for from an overture to the 50th anniversary special: a wonderful, spectacular-looking, twisty-turny nostalgia-fest. The show's still got it." Patrick Kavanagh-Sproull of Cultfix described the second part as a "return to form" concluding that "Apart from a few slightly faulty episodes, Series Seven was brilliant".

Reviewing the whole series for IGN, Mark Snow rated it 7.9/10 and wrote that the series was "a tumultuous one". He felt that although "the concepts were almost universally strong, cramming an entire movie's worth of ideas into a self-contained 50 minute episode inevitably left plot-threads dangling". However, he thought that it "succeeded where it really counted – with strong character work, sporadically genius story concepts, and some show-altering twists that ensure we're as jazzed as ever for the forthcoming TV event of the semi-century". Peter Canavese of Groucho Reviews rated it 3.5/4, and wrote that "In the penultimate batch of episodes before Doctor Whos jubilee year, executive producer Steven Moffat continues to marvel with his ability to keep the time-and-space-travelling Doctor in ever-so-complicated trouble." He also praised the cast who were "very much on top of their collective game", and "The Impossible Girl" story arc. In his review of the seventh series' home media release, Mark Redfern of Under the Radar commented that the seventh series "features its share of hits and misses", but "mostly finds Doctor Who still in fine form". He listed the episodes "The Bells of Saint John" and "Nightmare in Silver" as "underwhelming", but praised the episodes "Asylum of the Daleks" and "The Angels Take Manhattan" for the introduction of Clara and departure of the Ponds respectively, as well as "Hide", "The Journey to the Center of the TARDIS" and "The Crimson Horror".

Awards and nominations

Soundtrack 
Selected pieces of score from this series (from "Asylum of the Daleks" to "The Name of the Doctor", excluding "The Snowmen"), as composed by Murray Gold, were released on 9 September 2013 by Silva Screen Records. The music from "The Doctor, the Widow and the Wardrobe" and "The Snowmen" was released on a separate soundtrack on 21 October 2013.

Series 7

Christmas specials

References

External links 

 
 Series 7 Episode Guide Radio Times

Series 07
Series 07
2012 in British television
2012 British television seasons
2013 British television seasons
 
Split television seasons